Aleksei Vladislavovich Popov (born 7 July 1978) is a Russian-born Kazakhstani football coach and a former player. 

In 2010, he took Kazakhstani citizenship to play for the national team.

Career statistics

Club

International

Statistics accurate as of match played 12 October 2010

Honours
Amkar Perm
Russian Second Division Ural (1): 1998
Russian First Division (1): 2003
Rubin Kazan
Russian Premier League (2): 2008, 2009

References

External links
 Player page on the official FC Rubin Kazan website 
 

Sportspeople from Perm, Russia
Kazakhstani people of Bulgarian descent
Kazakhstani people of Russian descent
Russian footballers
FC Amkar Perm players
FC Rubin Kazan players
Russian Premier League players
Kazakhstani footballers
Kazakhstan international footballers
Kazakhstani expatriate footballers
Expatriate footballers in Russia
1978 births
Living people
Kazakhstani football managers
Association football defenders
FC Zvezda Perm players